Qara Tavareh (also Romanized as Qarā Ţavareh and Qarāţūreh; also known as Qarah Ţūreh and Qareh Tūreh) is a village in Howmeh Rural District, in the Central District of Bijar County, Kurdistan Province, Iran. At the 2006 census, its population was 141, in 42 families. The village is populated by Kurds.

References 

Towns and villages in Bijar County
Kurdish settlements in Kurdistan Province